Sprotbrough and Cusworth is a civil parish in the City of Doncaster in South Yorkshire, England, with most of its settlements on the western edge of the Doncaster built-up area. It had a population of 12,166 in 2001 and 12,134 at the 2011 Census. The parish covers most of Doncasters outlying suburbs including the villages of Sprotbrough, Cusworth, and a small part of Scawsby, in addition to several rural hamlets and farmsteads.

Numerous other parishes border it, among them Warmsworth, Balby, Brodsworth and Marr.

Origins and history 
The name Sprotbrough originates from the Old English sprote ('shoot', 'twig') and burh ('fortification'), as suggested by the Domesday Book entry Sproteburg; the name may reflect the hasty manner in which the fortification was constructed and / or may be a reference to the building material used.

The early parish contained six settlements:
 Sprotbrough (Sproteburg)
 Cadeby (Catebi)
 Wildthorpe (Widentorp)
 Cusworth (Cuzenworde)
 Skinthorpe (Scinestorp)
 Newton, first mentioned in 1379 when it was called New Farmstead

Those early hamlets were ringed by vast areas of agricultural land and many of the open fields still present today have names that can be traced back to early maps of the area.

The area, and almost all of the land around it, was owned by the FitzWilliam family for many years. Sir John Fitzwilliam erected a cross next to the church during the reign of Henry V of England. Into the cross were carved these lines: "Whoso is hungry and lists to eat, Let him come to Sprotburgh for his meat, And for a night and for a day, His horse shall have both corne and hay, And no man shall ask him when he goeth away."

There are also a number of statues and memorials to the Fitzwilliams and Copleys in the Grade I listed Church of St Mary the Virgin.

Sprotbrough Hall
Part of the village was built on the site of Sprotbrough Hall, a large home built for the Copley family in 1670. The Copley family had married a FitzWilliam heiress and inherited the extensive holdings of the FitzWilliam lords of Sprotborough (older spelling). The family lost three sons in the First World War and the Hall was demolished in the 1920s. Doncaster archives hold a copy of the catalogue of the house contents. Little evidence of the Hall remains except for the old 18th century stable yard, now apartments, and some of the street names. The wrought-iron gate opposite the village shop is from the "Lady's Walk" which was part of the gardens. This has been resited to its present position. Looking up from the towpath by the river, the balustraded viewing area which was directly in front of the Hall can still be seen. Copley Junior School in Sprotbrough village is named after the Copley family.

The Second World War hero Sir Douglas Bader grew up at the Rectory in the village when his step-father was Rector of St Mary's. The Old Rectory, previously a guest house, bears a plaque commemorating Bader's residence. Sir Walter Scott set Ivanhoe in and around the village, which is remembered in the name of the village's pub and a small housing estate off Sprotbrough Road.

Cusworth Hall
Cusworth Hall, which overlooks the parish to the north, was built by William Wrightson between 1740 and 1755 and was the home of the Battie-Wrightson family until 1952. It is now owned by the Metropolitan Borough of Doncaster and houses the Museum of South Yorkshire Life.  To the South East of the Hall is Richmond Hill.

Town End 
The eastern part of Sprotbrough, from where Sprotbrough Road meets the A638 and A19 to the bridge over the A1(M) is known as Lower Sprotbrough, and is more suburban. Town End is located at St Mary's Roundabout near Bentley. It was developed from farm land in around 1926 and was part of Bentley with Arksey Urban District until the formation of the Metropolitan Borough of Doncaster under the Local Government Act 1972. The church of St Edmund on Anchorage Lane was built in a converted barn on the former farm land when the area was being developed. Close to the church is the scout hut and Area51 Skate and BMX park, the most popular skatepark in the Doncaster Borough, which is currently looking to extend its facilities.

Town End was formerly the home of the Sprotbrough Foundry, opened by the Ministry of Supply in 1943, which among other things provided parts for tanks and other military vehicles. The works closed in the early 1980s and the site is occupied by a housing estate whose roads bear the names of some of the machines that were built there.

Names
From this town of Sprotborough the surname Spreadborough was formed.

Politics
Sprotbrough and Cusworth Parish Council meet at the Goldsmith Centre on Sprotbrough Road and at the Scawsby Community Centre. The parish council consists of:
4 Conservative Party councillors
4 Labour Party councillors
4 Green Party councillors
4 independent councillors
1 councillor with the description I Always Put Sprotbrough First

Two Conservative councillors represent the Sprotbrough ward on Doncaster Metropolitan Borough Council. The ward also includes surrounding rural villages outside the parish. Cusworth forms part of the Roman Ridge ward, represented by two Labour councillors. The ward also includes some northwestern suburbs of Doncaster.

The parish falls under the parliamentary constituency of Doncaster North, represented by Ed Miliband MP.

Geography

Amenities
A key focal point of Sprotbrough is St Mary's Church, founded in 1176, with a clock tower that has commanding views of the Don Valley.

Schools in the parish include Copley Junior School, Orchard Infant School, Saltersgate Junior and Infants Schools, and Richmond Hill Primary School. The nearest secondary schools is Ridgewood School in Scawsby.

Transport
Public transport is available in both Sprotbrough and Cusworth. Sprotbrough is served by bus 219 which is operated by Stagecoach Yorkshire.
Cusworth is served by the 41 and 41a service operated by First, which runs through Cusworth every 20 minutes.

River
The village is on the River Don and a weir which is bypassed by Sprotbrough Lock, allowing boats to pass safely. It is close to the A1(M) bridge over the Don. The Trans Pennine Trail follows the river at this point.

Extending to the south-west the River Don flows through Sprotbrough Gorge, a site of special scientific interest (SSSI). The gorge is an important site for rare plants, invertebrates and breeding site for birds. Overall the SSSI covers 76.9 hectares (190.1 acres) and was notified in 1988. Enclosed in this area is Sprotborough Flash Nature Reserve.

Public houses
Cadeby has one public house:
 The Cadeby Inn - in the centre of the village

Cusworth:
 The Mallard - off Cusworth Lane

Scawsby:
 The Sun - at the Barnsley Road/York Road junction
 The Millhouse (formerly Scawsby Mill) - on Barnsley Road near Scawsby Lane
 York Bar Working Mens Club - on York Road near Cusworth Lane

Sprotbrough:
 The Boat Inn - a gastro-pub situated on Nursery Lane by the river
 The Ivanhoe - a medium-sized pub adjoining a cricket pitch
 The Newton Arms - situated on Sprotbrough Road
 Sprotbrough Country Club - a private members' club in the village area of Sprotbrough
 OTTO's wine bar - Situated in the central shopping parade

Town End:
 Three Horse Shoes - on banks of river Don - North Bridge - Traditional British pub

Parks
Sprotbrough has three parks, Anchorage Lane, Sprotbrough Road and New Lane (village). The 'village' (the western part of the parish) has a park which has recently been doubled in size consisting of a football pitch and a children's play area. In June each year, it hosts a gala organised by the local Scout group. The main event in this is the 6.5 km fun run starting and finishing in the park and going through High Melton and Cadeby.

See also
Listed buildings in Sprotbrough and Cusworth

References

External links

Parish council website
 Health statistics for Sprotbrough
 Methodist church
 Boy drowns in 2002
Sprotbrough music society

Geography of the Metropolitan Borough of Doncaster
Civil parishes in South Yorkshire